Club de Regatas Vasco da Gama Basquete, or C.R. Vasco da Gama Basquete, is a Brazilian men's professional basketball club that is based in Rio de Janeiro, Brazil. It is a part of the multi-sports club C.R. Vasco da Gama. Vasco da Gama Basquete was founded on May 11, 1920.

History
Vasco da Gama won the CBB Championship title in the years 2000 and 2001, and the FIBA South American League championship in the years 1999 and 2000. They also won the South American Club Championship in the years 1998 and 1999.

The club also played at the 1999 McDonald's Championship, losing the final to San Antonio Spurs. The club is the first Brazilian club to play against an NBA team.

In 2016, the club won the Liga Ouro, the competition that gives its champion a place in the next edition of the Brazilian premier professional basketball league, the NBB. The club then competed in Brazil's top-tier level, for the first time since 2003, as it competed in the 2016–17 NBB season.

Roster

Honours and titles

Worldwide
 Quadrangular Quarta Copa Mundial
 Champions (1): 1963
 McDonald's Championship
 Runners-up (1): 1999

Latin America
 Pan American Club Championship 
 Runners-up (1): 1999

Continental
 South American Club Championship
 Champions (2): 1998, 1999
 Runners-up (1): 2000
 FIBA South American League (LSB)
 Champions (2): 1999, 2000
 Runners-up (1): 2002

National
 CBB Championship
 Champions (2): 2000, 2001
 Runners-up (4): 1965, 1966, 1980, 1999
Brazilian Champions Cup
 Winners (1): 1981
 Liga Ouro
 Champions (1): 2016

Regional
 Rio de Janeiro State Championship
 Champions (16): 1946, 1963, 1965, 1969, 1976, 1978, 1979, 1980, 1981, 1983, 1987, 1989, 1992, 1997, 2000, 2001
 Runners-up (18): 1940, 1943, 1947, 1957, 1964, 1966, 1967, 1968, 1971, 1972, 1974, 1975, 1977, 1984, 1990, 1998, 2007, 2016

Noted players

 Alexey
 Fúlvio de Assis
 Aylton
 Byra Bello
 Edson Bispo
 Waldyr Boccardo
 Alfredo da Motta
 Demétrius
 Josuel dos Santos
 Nezinho dos Santos
 Roberto Felinto
 Fernando Freitas
 Gaúcho
 Guilherme Giovannoni
 Helinho
 Janjão
 Duda Machado
 Manteiguinha
 Mingão
 Paulinho Motta
 Nenê
 Ratto
 Rogério
 Caio Torres
 Valtinho
 Sandro Varejão
 Marquinhos Vieira
 Dani Farabello
 Muñoz
 Evaristo Pérez
 José Vargas
 Charles Byrd

Head coaches
 Alberto Bial
 Hélio Rubens
 Flor Meléndez

References

External links
Official website 
LatinBasket.com Team Page

Vasco
Basket